Brattskarvet Mountain is a mountain,  high, next north of Vendeholten Mountain in the Sverdrup Mountains of Queen Maud Land. It was photographed from the air by the Third German Antarctic Expedition (1938–39). It was mapped by Norwegian cartographers from surveys and air photos by the Norwegian–British–Swedish Antarctic Expedition (1949–52) and from air photos by the Norwegian expedition (1958–59) and named Brattskarvet (the "steep mountain").

See also
Brattskarvbrekka Pass

References
 

Mountains of Queen Maud Land
Princess Martha Coast